Silver steel is common tool steel that is supplied as a centerless ground round bar (with tolerances similar to that of drill bit).  The name comes from the highly polished appearance of the rods; there is no silver in the alloy.

Amongst other applications, it has been widely used to make such things as punches, engravers, screwdrivers. Sheffield silver steel is used in France as a blade steel for straight razors. In Finland, German silver steel was and still is widely used for Puukko knives.

The composition is defined by the British Standard BS-1407, and is given below.

In the annealed state it has a hardness of 27 HRC. It can be hardened to 64 HRC.

The European/Werkstoff equivalent is 1.2210 / 115CrV3, which also includes some vanadium.

References

Steels